Oleksi Semenovich Burdeinei CBE (Ukrainian: Олексій Семенович Бурдейний, Russified, Алексей Семёнович Бурдейный [Alexei Semionovich Burdeinei]; 18 October 1908 in Zhytomir, Russian Empire – 21 April 1987 in Moscow, Soviet Union) was a Soviet general.

Biography

Early life
Born to a workers' family, he graduated from a Rabfak and worked in a factory at his native town. He joined the Communist Party already in 1928. In June 1931, he was drafted into the Red Army, completing training in the Saratov Armored Force School the following year. From March 1932 he commanded a platoon in a mechanized brigade stationed near Kalynivka. In September 1935 he was assigned to command a company in the 5th Tank Corps. In September 1937 he entered the Academy of Mechanized and Motorized Services, graduating in May 1940 to become the deputy intelligence officer of the 53rd Tank Regiment. On October, he was made assistant to the operations department chief in the staff of the 4th Mechanized Corps.

World War II
Soon after the beginning of Operation Barbarossa, Burdeinei became a senior assistant to the Mechanized Forces' chief of operations in the 37th Army. In August 1941 he took over the 3rd Tank Brigade's 3rd Regiment. On January the next year he was posted as the 2nd Tank Brigade chief of staff.

In April 1942, when the 24th Tank Corps was formed, Burdeinei joined it as chief of staff to General Badanov. The Corps was sent to engage the advancing German forces in the South, and was nearly wiped out in the fighting near the Don River, during July. By late October, the unit has recovered from its losses after several months in the reserve. It was assigned to the Southwestern Front and took part in the Battle of Stalingrad. On December, the Corps destroyed the Tatsinskaya Airport and was renamed 2nd Tatsinskaya Guards Tank Corps in honor of this operation. After the Battle of Stalingrad the Corps was made part of the Voronezh Front on March. On 26 June 1943, Colonel Burdeinei assumed command over the Corps, holding the post to the end of the war. As such, he participated in the Battle of Kursk, and was promoted to Major General on 31 August. On 3 July 1944, during Operation Bagration, his units were the first to enter Minsk and liberated the city. He was promoted to the rank of Lieutenant General on the 2 November 1944. The Corps later took part in the Baltic, East Prussian, Vistula-Oder and Berlin operations. For his leadership during the Minsk Offensive he was awarded the title Hero of the Soviet Union (Medal no. 5026) on 19 April 1945.

Post-war years
In May 1946, Burdeinei was assigned as the 7th Mechanized Army's chief of staff. He studied at the Voroshilov Academy from December 1947 to February 1950. In October 1950, he became the commander of the 8th Mechanized Army, a position he held until June 1953. In April 1954, he was transferred to serve as the Belorussian Military District's deputy commander for tank troops. In January 1958, he was posted as deputy commander for training, and from May 1960 he served as the First Deputy Commander of the District.

In August 1963, he was assigned as the Chief of the Central Armored Directorate in the Ministry of Defence. In August 1970 he was appointed representative of the Warsaw Pact Chief-of-Staff to the East German National People's Army, and retired from the Armed Forces in January 1974. He lived in Moscow and died on 21 April 1987.

Beside his military career, he was also an honorary citizen of Minsk since 1967 and a deputy in the 3rd Convocation of the Ukrainian SSR's Supreme Soviet. A street in Minsk was named after him.

Honours and awards
 Hero of the Soviet Union (including Order of Lenin and Gold Star medal - No. 5026, 19 April 1945) - for skillful command of a tank corps in the Belorussian operation, exemplary fulfillment of the command in the battles against the Nazi invaders, and for his heroism and courage
 Two Orders of Lenin
 Order of the Red Banner, four times
 Order of Suvorov, 2nd Class, twice
 Order of Kutuzov, 2nd class
 Order of the Patriotic War, 1st class
 Order of the Red Star
 Honorary citizen of the hero city of Minsk
 Order of the British Empire 
 Virtuti Militari
 Patriotic Order of Merit

References

External links
 Alexei Burdeinei on Generals.dk.

1908 births
1987 deaths
Burials at Kuntsevo Cemetery
Soviet colonel generals
Soviet military personnel of World War II
Communist Party of the Soviet Union members
Heroes of the Soviet Union
Recipients of the Order of Lenin
Recipients of the Order of Suvorov, 2nd class
Recipients of the Order of Kutuzov, 2nd class
Recipients of the Order of the Red Banner
Commanders of the Order of the British Empire
Recipients of the Virtuti Militari (1943–1989)
Recipients of the Patriotic Order of Merit
Military personnel from Zhytomyr
Ukrainian people of World War II